Shenwan Hongyuan is a securities brokerage company in China which engages in the operation of large-scale comprehensive securities broking and trading services. The company was founded in 1996 and is headquartered in Xinjiang, China.

History

Shenwan Hongyuan is the result of multiple mergers of Chinese securities firms.

The company was first established on September 16, 1996 as Shenyin & Wanguo Securities via a merger between Shenyin Securities and Wanguo Securities. The merger happened in response to the "327 incident" which occurred in 1995. It involved a placement of a huge sell order on three-year government bond futures shortly before the close of trading on February 23. The transactions were discovered Shanghai Stock Exchange and nullified resulting in Wanguo Securities almost going bankrupt. Wanguo Securities' president, Guan Jinsheng was sentenced to 17 years in jail for market manipulation and his firm was forced to merge with Shenyin Securities.

In 1998, the company advised on the China's biggest asset restructuring deals,which included Shanghai Pharmaceuticals, Shanghai Shenda, Shanghai Sanmao Group, and Nantong Machinery. For both 1998 and 1999 the company ranked first among brokerages in terms of net assets, net profit and stock trading volume.

On January 2015, the company merged with Hongyuan Securities which was the first securities firm to have listed in China. The deal was valued at nearly 40 billion yuan (US$ 6.3 billion) making it the biggest brokerage merger in China at the time. After the merger, the company was renamed to its current name, Shenwan Hongyuan and also became the second largest brokerage firm in China by market value at the time due to surge in stock price on its trading debut. During this time, Shenwan Hongyuan  also moved its headquarters to Urumqi, Xinjiang.

On April 26, 2019, Shenwan Hongyuan held an initial public offering for its H shares on the Hong Kong Stock Exchange. However unlike the strong performance of its A shares in 2015, the performance of its H share price dropped 12% on its trading debut.

Regulatory issues 

On September 3, 2020, the Securities and Futures Commission issued a restriction notice to Shenwan Hongyuan to freeze client accounts linked to suspected market manipulation.

In March 2022, the China Securities Regulatory Commission fined Shenwan Hongyuan for improper management of compliance controls related to Ant Group.

See also 
 Securities industry in China

References

External links
 Official site

Companies listed on the Shenzhen Stock Exchange
Companies listed on the Hong Kong Stock Exchange
Financial services companies established in 1996
Companies based in Xinjiang
Investment banks in China
Financial services companies of China
H shares